The Women's Intercontinental Cup is a roller hockey competition organized by World Skate and contested between the championship clubs from World Skate Africa, World Skate Asia, World Skate Oceania, World Skate Europe, and World Skate America.

History
The tournament was created as part of the merger of the International Federation of Roller Sports (FIRS) and the International Skateboarding Federation (ISF), which created World Skate in 2017. It uses a similar format to the men's Roller Hockey Intercontinental Cup.

Winners

Statistics

Winners by team

Winners by country

References

External links 
 World Competitions at RinkHockey.net

Roller hockey competitions
Recurring sporting events established in 2018
Women's roller hockey
Multi-national professional sports leagues